Matteo Grassotto (born 14 March 1980 in Asolo, Veneto) is an Italian racing driver.

Career

Formula Renault
Grassotto finished as runner-up in the 1998 Formula Renault Campus Italy series and then moved up to FRenault 2000 for 2000.  In the European-wide series he finished a competitive third in the final standings, and he also drove a handful of races in the Italian series, achieving one podium finish.

Formula Three
Grassotto graduated to German Formula Three in 2001, and finished 11th in the final drivers' standings.

Formula 3000
Grassoto spent 2002 and 2003 in the Euro Formula 3000 series, in which he was a frontrunner, before moving to the more competitive FIA-backed series for the final two races of 2004 as a replacement for compatriot Raffaele Giammaria.  He scored a point for eighth place on his début but retired from the next race.  Unable to get a drive in the new GP2 Series for 2005, he went back to country level and competed in one race in Italian F3000.

Racing record

Complete International Formula 3000 results
(key) (Races in bold indicate pole position; races in italics indicate fastest lap.)

References
Matteo Grassotto career statistics at driverdb.com, retrieved 27 November 2006.

1980 births
Living people
People from Asolo
Italian racing drivers
Italian Formula Renault 2.0 drivers
Auto GP drivers
German Formula Three Championship drivers
International Formula 3000 drivers
Sportspeople from the Province of Treviso

JD Motorsport drivers
Durango drivers
Draco Racing drivers
Target Racing drivers
Cram Competition drivers